is a railway station on the Tsurumi Line in Tsurumi-ku, Yokohama, Kanagawa Prefecture, Japan, operated by East Japan Railway Company (JR East). The station is located on the grounds of Toshiba's Keihin Product Operations, and the only exit from the station is into the company's grounds. As a result, only Toshiba employees with valid employee ID cards and invited visitors are permitted to enter and exit the station.

Lines

Station layout
A single side platform, located on the waterfront of Tokyo Bay, serves one line for both inbound and outbound trains. The exit is located opposite the buffer stop, with simplified Suica terminals and a ticket disposal box. There is also an automatic ticket machine.

Platform

Service
Umi-Shibaura is served hourly during off-peak times (midday, night and weekends), with more frequent services during morning and evening rush hours.

History

Umi-Shibaura Station was opened on 1 November 1940 as a station on a spur line of the privately held . The Tsurumi Rinkō line was nationalized on 1 July 1943, and was later absorbed into the Japanese National Railways (JNR) network. The station has been unstaffed since 1 March 1971, although the adjacent Toshiba guardhouse is staffed 24 hours a day. Following the privatization of JNR on 1 April 1987, the station was transferred to operation by JR East. In 2000, Umi-Shibaura Station was selected as one of the top 100 stations in the Kantō region by a public poll conducted by the Ministry of Land, Infrastructure, Transport and Tourism.

Surrounding area
Toshiba owns the land beneath the station and the surrounding portion of the Tsurumi Line, and JR East operates both under a long-term lease. Because of the surrounding scenery, and its status as "the station which you can never leave", Umi-Shibaura has been featured in several books and television programs and has gained some popularity as a day-trip destination. Toshiba has catered to these tourists by constructing a small park (Shibaura Park) within the station for employees and waiting passengers; it is open to the public (during business hours) and has a sweeping view of the surrounding sea.

References

 Harris, Ken and Clarke, Jackie. Jane's World Railways 2008-2009. Jane's Information Group (2008).

External links

 JR East Umi-Shibaura Station information 

Railway stations in Kanagawa Prefecture
Railway stations in Japan opened in 1940
Toshiba
Railway stations without public access